The Belkahve Tunnel is a motorway tunnel located in Izmir Province, Aegean Region as part of the Gebze-Orhangazi-İzmir Motorway  in Turkey.

Situated at Belkahve Hill between Kavaklıdere in Bornova district and Ulucak in Kemalpaşa east of Izmir, it is a -long twin-tube tunnel carrying three lanes of traffic in each direction. The construction works are being carried out by Otoyol A.Ş., a consortium of Turkish Nurol, Özaltın, Makyol, Yüksel, Göçay and Italian Astaldi companies. The New Austrian Tunnelling method (NATM) is being applied for the boring of the tunnel. Grounbreaking ceremony was held in presence of Minister of Transport, Maritime and Communication Binali Yıldırım on 7 July 2013.

The tunnel was opened to traffic on 8 March 2017 by Turkish Prime Minister Binali Yıldırım.

Other tunnels on the route are the -long Orhangazi Tunnel and the -long Selçukgazi Tunnel.

See also
List of motorway tunnels in Turkey

References

Road tunnels in Turkey
Transport in İzmir Province
Bornova District